Sophie Anderson (born 23 November 1987) is an English pornographic actress, internet personality, and recording artist. She began appearing in pornographic films such as Fake Taxi and Evil Angel in 2017, later finding internet fame in October 2018 when she and fellow porn star Rebecca More, who brand themselves "The Cock Destroyers", posted a video that went viral. Both her and More's videos became memes and the pair were subsequently been regarded as 'gay icons'. Since 2022, Anderson has appeared on various podcasts discussing her life and appeared as a team captain on the Canadian OutTV sex education quiz show Fucking Smart.

Early and personal life 
Anderson was born in Bristol, England on 23 November 1987 and said she began being sexually active at the age of 10, and would perform fellatio on men at local pubs in exchange for alcohol and drugs. Anderson is a member and an advocate of the LGBTQ community, as she herself is openly bisexual, and often shares her struggles on Twitter, about growing up bisexual. She also has a son. Anderson, who is known for her extreme body modification has size 32J breasts. In March 2022, she was hospitalised after one of her left breast implant got infected with sepsis and later exploded. She opened a GoFundMe to pay for her reconstruction surgery and raised over £10,000. She had the breast reconstructed, however it got infected again and Anderson posted various updates on her condition after it began leaking. Anderson has worked as an escort, and claims to have slept with around 80,000 people. She is in a relationship with Damian Oliver, a former footballer turned pornographic actor who has three children.

Career
Anderson began performing in pornographic films in 2017, appearing in three lesbian scenes for Fake Taxi. Since then, she has appeared in a scene for Reality Kings with Jordi El Niño Polla titled "Air Jordi". as well as scenes for other studios including a cuckold themed video for Brazzers, and scenes for  Wicked Pictures and Evil Angel which included anal and double penetration. She also discussed her porn series with Television X on Calum McSwiggan's podcast. She also has her own OnlyFans page, where she posts videos and a joint page "F**king Explorers" alongside her partner Damian Oliver. Anderson gained internet fame in October 2018 after a video of her and fellow pornographic actress Rebecca More promoting a gangbang by calling themselves "The Cock Destroyers" went viral. She frequently posts videos on social media of improvisational and often explicit songs she writes during everyday life. One of these, "Driving For Dick" was remixed and released as Anderson's debut single as a recording artist in August 2019, as well as an acoustic version. In October 2019, Anderson and More, featured in a non-sex role in A Tale Of Two Cock Destroyers, a gay pornographic film for Men.com which starred actors Jonas Jackson, JJ Knight, Leander, Joey Mills, Ty Mitchell and Johnny Rapid. In 2020, Anderson and More along with gay porn actor Matthew Camp began presenting Slag Wars: The Next Destroyer, a reality television competition series on their quest to discover who will be named The Next Cock Destroyer. In May 2021, Anderson announced on Twitter that she and More were parting ways, resulting in an indefinite hiatus of the Cock Destroyers. In 2022, she appeared on the sex education quiz show Fucking Smart alongside Willam Belli and various other drag queens and guests. She also appeared on various podcasts discussing her life and career in pornography including The Fellas and Anything Goes with James English.

In popular culture 
Audio clips of Anderson and More were featured on the King Princess remix "cock destroyer", released on 4 March 2019 through SoundCloud. For the girl group challenge on the first series of RuPaul's Drag Race UK, drag queens Baga Chipz, Blu Hydrangea and Divina de Campo named themselves the "Frock Destroyers" after Anderson and More. In the second season of Drag Race Holland, contestant Keta Minaj impersonated Anderson for the Snatch Game challenge.

Discography

Singles

References

External links 
 
 
 

1987 births
Living people
Actresses from Bristol
English electronic musicians
English female adult models
English pornographic film actresses
OnlyFans creators
Bisexual pornographic film actresses
British LGBT rights activists
Models from Bristol
British Internet celebrities
English LGBT actors